Penguin Villa is a one-man Thai pop band consisting of musician and producer Jettamon "Jay" Malayota ('เจ' เจตมนต์ มละโยธา).

Jetamon started his music career when he was in his second bachelor years, being a guitarist for an alternative rock band Proud, also wrote a lyrics for Proud's Ther Kue Kwam Fan (เธอคือความฝัน - "You're a dream.") a very successful hit of its time.

His song "Acrophobia" featured in the latest film by Apichatpong Weerasethakul, Uncle Boonmee Who Can Recall His Past Lives.

References 

Thai pop music groups
Living people
People from Phuket province
Year of birth missing (living people)